Geoffrey Alselin was an Anglo-Norman, who at some time after the Norman conquest of England received Elvaston, Derbyshire and Laxton, Nottinghamshire.

Alselin began the construction of the motte-and-bailey castle that stood at Laxton, Nottinghamshire, although it would not be completed until after Alselin's son-in-law, Robert de Caux, was appointed the hereditary Keeper of the Royal Forests of Nottingham. The castle would remain in the family's hereditary control until it was transferred, in the reign of King John, to the Everingham family by marriage with the heiress.

References

Year of birth unknown
Year of death unknown
People from Newark and Sherwood (district)
11th-century English nobility